Streptomyces herbaceus is a bacterium species from the genus of Streptomyces which has been isolated from soil of a hay meadow from the Cockle Park Experimental Farm in Northumberland in the United Kingdom.

See also 
 List of Streptomyces species

References

External links
Type strain of Streptomyces herbaceus at BacDive -  the Bacterial Diversity Metadatabase

herbaceus
Bacteria described in 2012